Wetrix is a 3D puzzle video game developed by Zed Two, the studio of brothers Ste and John Pickford, for the Nintendo 64 and personal computers in 1998, and the Dreamcast and Game Boy Color in 1999 (as Wetrix+ and Wetrix GB respectively). The player's goal is to hold water bubbles falling on a 3D isometric landscape. To do this, enclosures are created with Uppers, which fall in a similar manner to Tetris blocks, that raise the ground. While water can be evaporated with fireballs, hazards such as Mines, Ice Cubes, and earthquakes also fall and ruin the player's construction.

The Pickfords conceived a Tetris-esque puzzle game out of a water demo they worked on for another one of their Zed Two games, the hack and slash Vampire Circus. For design, the biggest focus was on the basic elements' interaction with each other, as well as the puzzle game style's originality; the use of falling blocks was the only similarity between Wetrix and Tetris. Zed Two signed a two-game deal with Ocean Software, a week before its merge with Infogrames. It required the brothers to turn Vampire Circus into Taz Express (2000), while allowing the brothers free rein with Wetrix. The PC version was produced from January to October 1997 by the brothers themselves, while the Nintendo 64 port was developed with three additional programmers from around June to Christmas 1997.

The Nintendo 64 version sold over 105,000 units in the West, and just above 12,000 in Japan, while the PC version sold 30,000 copies. Wetrix was generally well-received by critics, who applauded its addictiveness and original concept but were critical of the limited camera mobility and divided on its difficulty, steep learning curve, and two-player mode. It garnered the highest rating for a review of a Western-developed title from the Japanese magazine Famitsu Weekly in years. The critical and commercial success motivated Imagineer, developers of the Game Boy Color port, to commission Zed Two to develop a sequel, the PlayStation 2 launch title Aqua Aqua, which made little alterations to the main gameplay.

Gameplay 

Wetrix is an isometric puzzle video game where the player, on a square landscape, produces mounds to hold water bubbles falling from the sky. Uppers, pieces that raise a part of the landscape that come in the shapes of rectangles, squares, and T-shapes, create walls for the lakes, while Downers do the opposite. If there is no wall in its way, water will seep off the edges and into a water meter; the game ends once it is full. Fireballs pop up which can evaporate water, which gives the player an amount of points depending on how much water was vaporized. There are also hazards that ruin the player's structure, such as Mines which blast holes into the ground, Ice Cubes that freeze the water, and earthquakes that quickly turn the landscape flat once it is too high.

In addition to the regular Classic mode, Wetrix has Pro, which quickens the speed of the game, and Practice, which teaches basic rules. Challenge modes include those that end after a certain amount of time, such as one minute and five minutes, and others that must be survived within a number of pieces, including 100 and 500. There are also Handicap modes that start a game with a half-full water drain, an ice layer, Raised Land, Random Land, and Random Holes. The only multi-player feature is a two-player split screen battle mode, with the same goal as Classic but a different water meter with four colored spaces. One player can launch an attack at the other depending on which color space the water levels at; the meter also can not be lowered by evaporating a lake with a fireball.

Development

Origins 
In the mid-1990s, brothers Ste and John Pickford, developers at Software Creations, were dissatisfied with the stillborn projects and perceived declining creativity at the studio. They left to form their own independent company, Zed Two, in an attempt to "re-learn game design from the very basics". The studio's first project was Vampire Circus, a 3D isometric hack and slash video game in the style of Gauntlet (1985). John conceived programming methods that would have taken the most advantage of the available technology, such as having hundreds of foes on the screen at a time, and animating environmental elements in a "dynamic" manner. The environmental animations would be incorporated by having almost every part of the level be inflammable, and including flowing water that reacts to the explosions.

While Ste created the backgrounds and monsters, John experimented with water animation in a "testbed" separate from Vampire Circuss code. Unlike other 3D games at the time that used a flat plane moving up and down as water, Vampire Circus was planned to have water moving as a "dynamic fluid". The testbed consisted of a flat plane grid of vectors. Drops of water would fall onto them and combine to form pools of liquid that flowed and dropped off the plane. To further test the water meshing, John programmed the ability to shift the vectors of the plane. The water was a success.

The Pickfords' personal enjoyment of the water demo then gave them the idea to turn it into its own puzzle game. The game was initially named, as a joke, Wetris, but the title was later changed to something less similar to Tetris, Wetrix. Zed Two planned to release it as their first product before Vampire Circus. In their mind, the game would be cheaper and simpler to create, thus less of a risk to potential publishers, than Vampire Circus. Therefore, it could be used to make them established enough to produce the more ambitious hack and slash project.

However, as the Pickforks realized when searching for deals, "publishers only wanted big, ambitious expensive games, and weren't interested in cheap, small games, even if they were profitable", explained Ste. When pitching the puzzle game to Ocean Software, it did not initially grasp the publisher. However, within a week, the water demo was heavily played by testers, as well as a receptionist in-between calls. This won Zed Two a deal with Ocean to publish two games: Vampire Circus and Wetrix. Ocean required the small studio to turn Vampire Circus into a game starring the Tasmanian Devil, which became Taz Express (2000). However, the brothers were allowed free rein with Wetrix. This was the last deal Ocean made, as it began its merging into Infogrames a week later.

Design  
Much brainstorming was done on what type of puzzle game to produce, such as being in the style of Lemmings (1991) or The Incredible Machine series, but they ultimately settled on a Tetris-esque game. Wetrix was the Pickfords' first puzzle video game, a genre that was "surprisingly difficult" for them. Explained Ste, "we tried to think about the thought processes and the emotions involved in playing a great puzzle game -- then tried to re-create and enhance those experiences with our own gameplay." A majority of the Pickfords' focus was on the basic elements of the gameplay, particularly their interaction between each other. Ste described the visuals for the "simplest elements" as the hardest to get right, even more than the special effects; he recalled creating "eight or nine" variations of the uppers and downers, and "quite a few" for the water bubbles. Although a Tetris-style game was the initial concept, the only overlap between the two puzzle games was blocks falling to the ground. From the Pickfords' perspective, most other Tetris-inspired titles made too little changes to the rules, so they intended for Wetrix to be more original. One method was a creativity aspect, where there were infinite ways to build the landscape and, thus, players could experiment with different methods of scoring points.

Production 
Zed Two began the Wetrix project as a PC title, with no plans for porting to consoles. This was because, at the time, no small independent studio had the budget to develop for major consoles. After Zed Two's inquisition, a friend of the Pickfords, who worked at Software Creations, used the PC source to secretly code a Nintendo 64 port with the Manchester company's development kit. The programmer showed the brothers and Ocean the cartridge a week after the deal, and Ocean approved. Then, at an E3 conference, the brothers showed it to Nintendo for approval. As Ste recalled the Japanese company's reaction, "We booted up the game in the meeting room, they took one look and just said, 'Yep, we need all the games we can get!' And that was it, we were in business!"

The PC version was mostly only done by the Pickfords from January to October 1997, while a different team consisting of Amir Latif, David Gill, and Jan van Valburg programmed the Nintendo 64 release from around June to Christmas 1997. The brothers had no other source of income, meaning finishing either Wetrix or Vampire Circus needed to be done quickly to pay their rent. This budget limitation meant having to resort to a pre-made 3D model built into a package of 3D Studio 4 for the rubber duck. The polygon meshing and animations for the water flowing and 3D landscape shifting up and down were the easiest parts of development. John described the water animation as "a simple cellular system where each cell compares itself with its neighbours and exchanges water if there's a difference".

Release and ports 
IGN was the first publication to announce Wetrix on 14 August 1997, although only the Nintendo 64 version. It revealed Zed Two to be the developer, Ocean the publisher, and with no screenshot, only had the following description: "players must create (or open) channels of water and evaporate it using balloons that also fall onto the screen. The more water you dispose of the more points you acquire." On 12 March 1998, the cover art was revealed, and the date for the Nintendo 64 version was set at April 1998. It was delayed to June 1998, IGN suspecting it was due to issues of manufacturing copies.

Ocean released the Nintendo 64 version in May 1998 in Europe and on 16 June 1998 in North America, and Imagineer published it on 27 November 1998 in Japan. It sold over 105,000 units in the West, and just above 12,000 in Japan. Despite selling well, Wetrix had its budget cut by Infogrames, which was moved to other projects, feeling the puzzle title would not fit their reputation of producing "mega hit" games. This prevented Ocean US from selling more copies of the Nintendo 64 version than they did, and caused a seven-player LAN mode the brothers worked on to remain unfinished. The PC version was announced by Infogrames on 19 November 1998, and released on 15 January 1999, selling 30,000 copies worldwide.

Ocean hired Imagineer to develop a Game Boy Color port. Although the IP rights were held between Ocean and Zed Two, the port's development began without the knowledge of the Pickfords. The brothers were angry once they found out. Ocean and Zed Two settled by having the latter hold intellectual property rights for future iterations. John also created his own prototype of a Wetrix water level on the Game Boy Color, but Imagineer went with theirs instead. The Dreamcast port, Wetrix+ was released by Acclaim Entertainment in the United States on 16 December 1999 and by Take-Two Interactive in Europe in April 2000. A Japanese version of Wetrix for the Dreamcast, named Aquapanic, was commissioned but dropped near its completion, at the end of the console's lifespan.

Reception

Wetrix received generally positive reviews, including one in Famitsu, which had the highest rating for a Western-developed product in years. A common highlight was its unique puzzle game concept, which Nintendo Power described as a mixture of Tetris and Populous (1989). Due to the fact that it involves falling pieces, Wetrix was heavily compared to not only Tetris entries, but the Nintendo 64 titles Tetrisphere and Bust-A-Move 2 (1998). Edge considered Welltris (1990) the Tetris game most similar to Wetrix due to its use of falling pieces within a 3D perspective. The Electric Playground critic Victor Lucas and Hyper journalists Eliot Fish and Tom Holloway found its spin on Tetris elements refreshing, given the amount of other titles that copied Tetris mechanics without doing anything innovative. IGNs Trent C. Ward noted that with previous puzzle video games, "the further developers got from Tetris, the more annoyed people got", making Wetrixs success as both an original and enjoyable puzzle game profound.

The high difficulty and steep learning curve generally garnered a mixed response; critics suggested that while it would appeal to hardcore puzzle game veterans, it may not be suited for all players, especially first-timers. Reviewers from Edge and N64 Magazine claimed an individual's first playthrough can end in seconds. Lucas, a frequent player of puzzle gamers and self-admitted pro at Rampart (1990), which also involved building enclosures, was still in the first tutorial stage an hour into Wetrix. The challenge was attributed to the controls, fast object dropping, and the randomization of what falls. Official Nintendo Magazine found the Game Boy Color port inferior to the original Nintendo 64 release for its slower falling speed. Also brought up was the game's addictiveness. It was attributed to the difficulty, high-score list, multipliers, different methods of earning points, visual rewards, and additional modes. Excitedly wrote N64 Magazines James Price, "As it brooks little familiarity with lesser skilled players, you actually feel as if you're achieving something by reaching level 15 with an unbelievably high number of points."

Supporters of the challenge argued that it teaches players to long-term plan and not panic over small water drains. Detractors complained it was artificial and made the game more obnoxious than enjoyable. Consoles + found the board too small to create enough lakes to handle the overwhelming amount of water. Anne Royal of Computer Games Strategy Plus wrote that the slightest mistake could instantly end a play-through. She and Schneider felt the game should have adequately accustomed beginners to the gameplay, and John Davison argued the amount of randomization between uppers and water was too much. Jeff Gerstmann of GameSpot criticized the earthquake mechanic for effectively ending games, and opined it prevented Wetrix from being a truly amazing puzzle title. The PC version was also criticized for its controls. GameSpots Ron Dulin had trouble placing pieces with the mouse, and Ward struggled with the controls overall, especially the keyboard setups.

Reviewers found it overly tricky to place pieces, most attributed to the limited camera mobility; there are only three choices for viewing the map, two distant ones that make seeing where pieces will land very difficult, and another too close to see the entire map. Nintendo Power felt the issue was worsened by the controls not being sensitive enough. The problem was also blamed on misleading shadows, made harder to focus on them due to distracting visuals. The few angle choices also made looking for water trickles hard, not helped by the draining water's lack of graphical detail, argued Fish and Game Informer critics Jon and Reiner. Official Nintendo Magazine criticized the Game Boy Color version's color palette for making it hard to notice the location of lakes. Another point of critique was the general product's limited depth and replay-ability, where the experience wears thin after a few hours and was repetitive due to a lack of variation in gameplay and looks between stages. Huhtala noted the maximum difficulty to be at the tenth level.  PC Zone journalist Paul Presley found Wetrix "colourful and flashy on the surface", but "staggeringly ordinary". His main criticism was that the typical appealing elements of puzzle games, such as simplicity, quirkiness, and addictiveness, felt forced instead of naturally executed.

Opinions on the graphics ranged from Jon finding them "lame" and Fielder stating they need more finesse, to positive claims of taking advantage of console space even considering its simple style. Total 64s Simon argued it was mature in comparison to most other Nintendo 64 titles. Most of the praise was directed at the water, particularly its realistic flowing, ripple effects, transparency and reflection mapping. Other praised aspects include the special effects, the vibrant color palette and psychedelic backgrounds. Less positively, a writer for Revista Oficial Dreamcast called them "colorful and little else", bashing them as so outdated they would be suitable in the 8-bit console era. Wetrixs new age ambient techno soundtrack was well-received for suiting the gameplay, Schneider analogizing it as if Jean-Michel Jarre composed Top Gear Rally (1997). The sound effects were positively-commented on, a common note being their accuracy to real-life environmental elements, such as the splashes, ripples, and evaporation of water and the explosion of bombs. An Ultimate PC critic admitted the sound effects intensified the gameplay, stating the alarm "will almost certainly send a shiver down your spine". Also highlighted was the electronically-altered announcer voice, which Bad Hare of GamePro compared to that of Wipeout XL (1996). Schneider expressed being spooked out by it, and Lucas claimed the warble effect matched with the cute character designed.

The two-player mode divided critics. Its supporters highlighted the competitive nature of the mode, a result of each player having to focus on keeping their own board in tact while attacking the opponent. Others were underwhelmed. Schneider and Ricciardi found it weaker than two-player modes in other puzzle titles, such as Puzzle Bobble (1994) and those of the Tetris series. A common complaint was the decreased size of each player's map as a result of the split-screen, making it even harder to see the pieces. Official Nintendo Magazine reviewer Shaun White disliked the mode's slow pace, also expressing annoyance towards attacks temporarily obscuring the playing fields. Fielder and Gantayat also criticized the lack of four-player modes, such as tournaments and two-on-twos.

Legacy 
Wetrixs critical and commercial success inspired Imagineer to commission Zed Two to develop a sequel, Aqua Aqua (2000), which was a launch title for the PlayStation 2. The gameplay remained largely unaltered, new features including a Story Mode with bosses and cute-looking characters that Imagineer commanded Zed Two to add to make the product more appealing to Japanese audiences. Despite a positive critical reception and decent sales, there have been no further Wetrix titles.

Notes

References

External links
 

1998 video games
Cancelled PlayStation (console) games
Dreamcast games
Falling block puzzle games
Game Boy Color games
Imagineer games
Nintendo 64 games
Ocean Software games
Windows games
Video games developed in the United Kingdom